Carrickshock is an Irish Gaelic Athletic Association club situated in the south of County Kilkenny, Ireland. The club was founded in 1928 when the teams from Hugginstown and Knockmoylan were amalgamated in commemoration of the Battle of Carrickshock, 1831.

Carrickshock have had success in the Kilkenny Senior Hurling Championship, winning the competition seven times. Their record of four county titles in a row between 1940 and 1943 remained unbroken until 2009 when Ballyhale Shamrocks won their 4th title in succession.

Many players from the club have gone to achieve success with the Kilkenny intercounty team.

Honours 
Kilkenny Senior Hurling Championships: 7
 1931, 1938, 1940, 1941, 1942, 1943, 1951  
 Runners-up: 
 1929, 1932, 1933, 1934, 1935, 1939, 1944, 1945, 1946, 1948, 2010, 2013 
 Kilkenny Senior Hurling League 
 2012
Kilkenny Minor Hurling Championships: 2
 2001, 2002
 All-Ireland Intermediate Club Hurling Championship 1
 2017
Leinster Intermediate Club Hurling Championship 2
 2004, 2016
Kilkenny Intermediate Hurling Championships: 2
 2004, 2016
Kilkenny Junior Hurling Championships: 4
 1928, 1954, 1979, 1999

Notable hurlers
 Richie Power Snr 
 Pat Dwyer
 Jimmy Walsh  
 John Tennyson
 John Dalton
 Richie Power Jnr
 John Power
 Michael Rice
 Sean O' (John) Farrell (1909-72), 1933

External links
 Carrickshock on the official Kilkenny website
 Information about Carrickshock on the KilkennyCats website

References

Gaelic games clubs in County Kilkenny
Hurling clubs in County Kilkenny